Rhytidopoma coronatum is a species of an operculate land snail, terrestrial gastropod mollusk in the family Pomatiidae.

Distribution 
This species lives in Cuba, for example at Escaleras de Jaruco.

Ecology 
Rhytidopoma coronatum is a rock dwelling species.

Predators of Rhytidopoma coronatum include larvae of firefly bug Alecton discoidalis.

References

Pomatiidae
Gastropods described in 1856
Endemic fauna of Cuba